Willie Brown is an Australian former professional rugby league footballer who played in the 2000s, he played 2 matches for the Sydney Roosters in the 2007 National Rugby League season. He made his NRL debut in Round-4 2007 in the 16-32 loss to the Brisbane Broncos at SFS. He is of Samoan descent, and he previously served a 2-year Mormon missionary in the Philippines.

References 

Australian rugby league players
Australian sportspeople of Samoan descent
Australian expatriates in the Philippines
Sydney Roosters players
Rugby league props
Living people
Australian Latter Day Saints
Australian Mormon missionaries
Mormon missionaries in the Philippines
Rugby league players from Sydney
1979 births